The Ditidaht First Nation is a First Nations band government on southern Vancouver Island in British Columbia, Canada.

The government has 17 reserve lands: Ahuk, Tsuquanah, Wyah, Clo-oose, Cheewat, Sarque, Carmanah, Iktuksasuk, Hobitan, Oyees, Doobah, Malachan, Opatseeah, Wokitsas, Chuchummisapo and Saouk. Several of these traditional communities and the West Coast Trail became part of the newly established Pacific Rim National Park in 1973.

See also

Nitinaht language
Nuu-chah-nulth Tribal Council
Nuu-chah-nulth
Ditidaht Kids

External links

Ditidaht First Nation
Hike the West Coast Trail in Pacific Rim National Park

 
First Nations governments in British Columbia